Peter Consterdine is a British martial artist who holds a 9th Dan in karate. He was a Great Britain and England international spending nine years as a regular squad member of the Great Britain Karate squad.  He was Vice President of the English Karate Federation until his resignation in 2017.

Along with Geoff Thompson, Consterdine founded and operates the British Combat Association and its international arm the World Combat Association.

He is the author of numerous books and DVDs on the subjects of body guarding, self-protection and self-defence.  He leads training seminars about self-defence.

Bibliography

  The Modern Bodyguard, 1995
 Fit to Fight, 1996
 Streetwise, 1997
 Travelsafe, 2001

References

External links

Year of birth missing (living people)
Living people
British male karateka